Gian Louis Clavell López (born November 26, 1993) is a Puerto Rican professional basketball player for Prometey of the Latvian-Estonian Basketball League and EuroCup. He also represents the Puerto Rican national team.

He was named Mountain West Conference Player of the Year in 2017. Clavell became the first CSU Ram to win the award.

Professional career
After graduating from Colorado State University, Clavell signed a minor deal with the Brujos de Guayama in Puerto Rico. He played in three games for them around April 2017 before practicing for the 2017 NBA Draft. After going undrafted in the draft that year, Clavell joined the Miami Heat Summer League team. On July 23, 2017 he signed a partially-guaranteed deal with the Dallas Mavericks to join the preseason roster. His contract would later be converted to a two-way deal, meaning throughout his time with the Mavericks, he would split playing time between Dallas and their NBA G League affiliate, the Texas Legends. Clavell made his NBA debut on October 20, 2017 against the Sacramento Kings.

On November 17, 2017, the Mavericks waived Clavell from his two-way contract early to sign Antonius Cleveland.

He joined the Golden State Warriors for the 2018 NBA Summer League. On August 3, 2018, Clavell signed a one-year deal with Movistar Estudiantes of the Liga ACB.

In the summer of 2019, it was announced that Clavell will be joining the Portland Trail Blazers at NBA Summer League.

On December 11, 2019, he has signed with Frutti Extra Bursaspor of the Turkish Super League (BSL). He averaged 18 points per game.

On October 24, 2020, Clavell signed with Avtodor Saratov of the VTB United League. On April 28, 2021, Clavell signed with Promitheas Patras for the Greek Basket League playoffs.

On August 11, 2021, he has signed with Budivelnyk Kyiv of the Ukrainian Basketball SuperLeague.

In 2022, he signed with Cangrejeros de Santurce of the Baloncesto Superior Nacional in his home country of Puerto Rico.

On June 24, 2022, he has signed with Prometey of the Latvian-Estonian Basketball League.

Personal life
Clavell's brother, Gilberto, is also a professional basketball player and played college basketball at Sam Houston State.

Career statistics

NBA

Regular season

|-
| style="text-align:left;"| 
| style="text-align:left;"| Dallas
| 7 || 0 || 9.1 || .333 || .400 || 1.000 || 1.0 || .4 || .3 || .0 || 2.9

BSN

|-
| style="text-align:left;"| 2022
| style="text-align:left;"| Cangrejeros
| 26 || 26 || 30.1 || .396 || .320 || .700 || 2.9 || 2.5 || .846 || .269 || 14.8

References

External links
 Gian Clavell Colorado State Rams Profile
 Gian Clavell at fiba.basketball
 

1993 births
Living people
2019 FIBA Basketball World Cup players
Baloncesto Superior Nacional players
Basketball players from Miami
BC Avtodor Saratov players
BC Prometey players
Bursaspor Basketbol players
CB Estudiantes players
Central American and Caribbean Games gold medalists for Puerto Rico
Central American and Caribbean Games medalists in basketball
Colorado State Rams men's basketball players
Competitors at the 2018 Central American and Caribbean Games
Dallas Mavericks players
Expatriate basketball people in Turkey
Hialeah Gardens High School alumni
Junior college men's basketball players in the United States
Liga ACB players
National Basketball Association players from Puerto Rico
People from Caguas, Puerto Rico
Promitheas Patras B.C. players
Puerto Rican expatriate basketball people in Greece
Puerto Rican expatriate basketball people in Russia
Puerto Rican expatriate basketball people in Spain
Puerto Rican expatriate sportspeople in Ukraine
Puerto Rican men's basketball players
Shooting guards
Texas Legends players
Undrafted National Basketball Association players